Syneta albida, the western fruit beetle, is a species of beetles from the family of leaf beetles, subfamily Synetinae.

Distribution
The species is found in western North America.

Description
The length of the adult beetles, on average, is 6 mm.

Environment
Syneta albida feeds on the leaves of various deciduous trees: Quince (Cydonia), plum (Prunus), pear (Pyrus) and currant (Ribes).

The larvae eat tree roots, hibernate in the soil, and pupate in the spring.

References

Synetinae
Beetles described in 1857
Taxa named by John Lawrence LeConte